Twombly may refer to:

People
 Carol Twombly, American calligrapher
 Cy Twombly (1928–2011), American abstract artist
 Hamilton McKown Twombly, railroad tycoon, owner of Vinland Estate
 Mary Twombly (born 1935) American composer, conductor and pianist
 Voltaire P. Twombly, recipient of the Medal of Honor
 Wells Twombly (1935–1977), American sportswriter and author

Other uses
 Twombly Ridge, Maine, an unorganized area in the United States
 Twombly (cyclecar), an American automobile manufactured between 1913 and 1915
 Bell Atlantic Corp. v. Twombly, a United States Supreme Court case

See also
Twemlow, the Cheshire parish the name Twombly derives from